Kyaw is a town in Tilin Township, Gangaw District, in the north-western part of the Magway Region in Myanmar.  Kyaw lies on the left (eastern) bank of the Pindaung River.

Notes

External links
 "Kyaw Map — Satellite Images of Kyaw" Maplandia

Populated places in Magway Region